Juventus Football Club is an Italian professional association football club based in Turin, Piedmont, who currently play in the Serie A. They have played at their current home ground, Juventus Stadium, since 2011. This chronological list comprises all those who have held the position of manager of the first team of Juventus since the appointment of the club's first professional manager, Hungarian Jenő Károly, in 1923. Each manager's entry includes his dates of tenure and the club's overall competitive record (in terms of matches won, drawn and lost). Caretaker managers are included, where known, as well as those who have been in permanent charge. As of the start of the 2008–09 season, the club have had 31 full-time managers.

The most successful person to manage Juventus is Giovanni Trapattoni, who won six Football League titles (Scudetto), two Coppa Italias, one European Champions Clubs' Cup, one UEFA Cup Winners' Cup, two UEFA Cups, one UEFA Super Cup and one Intercontinental Cup in two periods from 1976 and 1986 and from 1991 to 1995. Trapattoni is also the club's longest-serving manager with thirteen seasons, ten of which consecutives.

List of managers 

The following is a list of managers of Juventus from 1923 when the Agnelli family took over and the club became more structured and organized, until the present day. Includes all competitive matches. Statistics are correct as of 2 November 2021.

 Notes:
M – Total number of matches played under manager

W – Matches won,
D – Matches drawn,
L – Matches lost,
GF – Goals for,
GA – Goals againstW% – Percentage of matches won
 Legend:
(int.) Interim manager

Nationality is indicated by the corresponding FIFA country code(s).

Trophies 

Manager in bold denotes the previous manager.

References 

managers
 
Juventus